Gary Arnold (born 5 December 1943) is a former Australian rules footballer who played with Richmond in the Victorian Football League (VFL).

Arnold, a Tasmanian, was a rover who came to Richmond from Rosebery. He played nine games in the 1963 VFL season. The following year he made only four appearances, but won the Gardiner Medal for his performances in the reserves.

He spent the 1965 season with the Dandenong Football Club and then joined Claremont in 1966.

References

1943 births
Australian rules footballers from Tasmania
Richmond Football Club players
Claremont Football Club players
Dandenong Football Club players
Living people